Yael Tauman Kalai is a cryptographer and theoretical computer scientist who works as a Senior Principal Researcher at Microsoft Research New England and as an adjunct professor at MIT in the Computer Science and Artificial Intelligence Lab.

Education and career
Kalai graduated from the Hebrew University of Jerusalem in 1997. She worked with Adi Shamir at the Weizmann Institute of Science, earning a master's degree there in 2001, and then moved to the Massachusetts Institute of Technology, where she completed her PhD in 2006 with Shafi Goldwasser as her doctoral advisor. She did postdoctoral study at Microsoft Research and the Weizmann Institute before becoming a faculty member at the Georgia Institute of Technology. She took a permanent position at Microsoft Research in 2008. She serves on the Scientific Advisory Board for the Institute for Computational and Experimental Research in Mathematics (ICERM).

Contributions
Kalai is known for co-inventing ring signatures, which has become a key component of numerous systems such as Cryptonote and Monero (cryptocurrency). Subsequently, together with her advisor Shafi Goldwasser, she demonstrated an insecurity in the widely used Fiat–Shamir heuristic.  Her work on delegating computation has applications to cloud computing.

Recognition
Kalai was an invited speaker on mathematical aspects of computer science at the 2018 International Congress of Mathematicians.

Her master's thesis introducing ring signatures won an outstanding master's thesis award and MIT PhD dissertation was awarded the George M. Sprowls Award for Outstanding PhD Thesis in Computer Science.

She was co-chair of the Theory of Cryptography Conference in 2017.

Personal

Kalai is the daughter of game theorist Yair Tauman. Her husband, Adam Tauman Kalai, also works at Microsoft Research.

References

External links

Year of birth missing (living people)
Living people
American cryptographers
American computer scientists
Israeli cryptographers
Israeli computer scientists
American women computer scientists
Theoretical computer scientists
Hebrew University of Jerusalem alumni
Weizmann Institute of Science alumni
Massachusetts Institute of Technology alumni
Georgia Tech faculty
American women academics
21st-century American women